In exploratory data analysis, the iconography of correlations is a method which consists in replacing a correlation matrix by a diagram where the “remarkable” correlations are represented by a solid line (positive correlation), or a dotted line (negative correlation).

This idea also appears in Gaussian graphic models used in particular in genome mapping. But the iconography of correlations is more general in that it does not make an assumption about the Gaussian distribution, or not, of the variables, and relies only on the geometric aspect of the Correlation coefficient.

The first idea of the iconography of correlations dates back to 1975. Applied first to marine geochemistry, it was the subject of a thesis in 1981, and of an article in Cahiers de l'Analyse des Données in 1982. After that, the application of the method in many branches of the aerospace industry 
 for about fifteen years, explains, paradoxically, the relative confidentiality in which it remained for a long time, companies not generally wishing to shout their solutions on the roofs. Since the creation in 1997 of a first company distributing software based on the iconography of correlations, and its teaching in some universities, the bibliography has grown widely, particularly in the medical 
 and astrophysical sectors (mass spectrometry)

See also 

 The Bayesian Network is a graph in which the cause and effect relationships are "probabilized", unlike the Correlation Iconography, whose principle is "geometric".

References

External links
 La représentation multidimensionnelle : une autre façon de présenter l’iconographie des corrélations

Data analysis